Nuruhunvi Loabi is a 1999 Maldivian drama film directed by Ahmed Ibrahim. Produced by Hussain Rasheed under Farivaa Films, the film stars Mohamed Abdul Hakeem, Thooba Ahmed and Abdul Salaam Abdul Hakeem in pivotal roles. The film was released on 1 December 1999.

Cast 
 Mohamed Abdul Hakeem
 Thooba Ahmed
 Abdul Salaam Abdul Hakeem
 Maimoona Yoosuf
 Mohamed Malik
 Waheedha Yoosuf
 Ahmed Ibrahim
 Fazeena Ahmed
 Hassan Afeef as Afeef

Soundtrack

References

1999 films
Maldivian drama films
1999 drama films
Dhivehi-language films